Emmanuel Agbadou (born 17 June 1997) is an Ivorian professional footballer who plays as a centre back for French club Reims.

Club career
In July 2019, Agbadou signed for US Monastir. On 25 September 2019, he played his first match against Stade Tunisien in a 1–0 win. 

On 16 June 2022, Agbadou signed a five-year contract with Reims in France.

International career
Agbadou debuted with the Ivory Coast national team in a friendly 3–0 loss to England on 29 March 2022.

References

External links 

1997 births 
Living people
Ivorian footballers
Association football defenders
Ivory Coast international footballers
Tunisian Ligue Professionnelle 1 players
Belgian Pro League players
FC San-Pédro players
US Monastir (football) players
K.A.S. Eupen players
Stade de Reims players
Ivorian expatriate footballers
Ivorian expatriate sportspeople in Tunisia
Expatriate footballers in Tunisia
Ivorian expatriate sportspeople in Belgium
Expatriate footballers in Belgium
Ivorian expatriate sportspeople in France
Expatriate footballers in France